O.F.I. (full name Omilos Filathlon Irakliou/ ) is a Greek multi-sport club based in Heraklion, Crete. It is commonly known as OFI Crete. It was founded in 1925 and it has teams in football, basketball, volleyball, water polo, athletics and other sports. The most successful team of the club is the football team which is the only department which has won a Panhellenic title, one Greek Football Cup. The team's colours are black and white.

Departments
OFI Crete F.C., football team that plays in Super League Greece (2019–20)
OFI Crete B.C., basketball team that plays in Greek B Basket League (2019–20)
OFI Crete V.C., volleyball team that plays in A1 Ethniki Volleyball (2019–20)
OFI Water Polo, Water Polo team that plays in A2 Ethniki Water Polo (2019–20)
OFI Crete F.C. Women, football team that plays in Greek A Division (2021-22)

History
OFI was founded in 1925 and originally it comprised football, athletics, wrestling and weightlifting departments. The football team became the most famous and the most popular of the club. OFI Football Club achieved to promote to A Ethniki in period 1967-68 for first time. After few years it was relegated but returned in A Ethniki again and it remained in the highest level for about 30 years. The football team is the only team of the club with Panhellenic title, since it has won the Greek cup in 1987. In recent years it is in a bad condition because of financial problems.

The club's men's basketball team won the championship of the Greek 4th-tier level Greek C Basket League in 1998, and was promoted to the third-tier level Greek B Basket League. After that, it was relegated back down the Greek C Basket League, but it returned to the Greek B Basket League in 2008.

The next year, OFI was promoted to the 2nd-tier level Greek A2 Basket League, for first time. After a short fall back into the Greek B Basket League, the club returned to the Greek A2 Basket League, and remained there until 2015, when the club was withdrawn from the league due to financial problems.

OFI has also water polo team with presence in A2 Ethniki (2nd-tier) and athletics team with successful presence in Pancretan Games.

Sport facilities
The football team plays in Theodoros Vardinogiannis Stadium, known also as Yedi Kule. The other departments play in Vardinogiannis Sports Center (V.A.K.).

Honours
Football team
Greek Football Cup
Winners (1): 1987
Balkans CupWinners (1): 1989

References

External links
 Amateur Departments of OFI
Football team

OFI Crete F.C.
1925 establishments in Greece
Multi-sport clubs in Greece
Athletics clubs in Greece